Cucumis trilobatus may refer to one of two separate species:

Cucumis ficifolius Cucumis trilobatus Forssk
Cyclanthera pedata Cucumis trilobatus L.